Llanelly is the name of a parish and coterminous community in the principal area of Monmouthshire, within the historic boundaries of Brecknockshire, south-east Wales. It roughly covers the area of the Clydach Gorge. The population of the parish and ward at the 2011 census was 3,899.

Location
The parish encompasses the area surrounding the Clydach Gorge, west of Abergavenny, east of Brynmawr and south of Crickhowell. The Church of St Elli  has its own page.

Settlements
Llanelly Hill, Blackrock, Clydach, Maesygwartha and Gilwern are the main settlements in the parish. Llanelly Hill occupies the north-west hilltop of the Clydach Gorge. It developed as a result of coal mining and limestone quarrying for the nearby ironworks including Clydach ironworks and Ebbw Vale ironworks.

Blackrock and Clydach North (also referred to as Cheltenham) were both built up along the turnpike road that ran on the north side of the river between Govilon and Merthyr Tydfil. Clydach South developed on the south side of the river above the ironworks. It climbs the north-west slopes towards Llanelly Hill.

Gilwern is located at the mouth of the River Clydach, where it meets the river Usk. 
Maesygwartha lies between Clydach and Gilwern along one of the many tram roads in the gorge.

History

The parish is part of the principal area of Monmouthshire. Before local government reorganisation in 1996, it was in the district of Blaenau Gwent, but the electors overwhelmingly voted to be transferred out. The Brecon Beacons National Park  encompasses the parish and the surrounding area.

Governance
The electoral ward of Llanelly Hill is coterminous with the Llanelly community and elects one county councillor to Monmouthshire County Council.

Notable persons
Sir Henry Bartle Frere (1815–1884), Governor-General of South Africa at the outbreak of the Anglo-Zulu War  
Thomas Phillips (1801–1867), Mayor of Newport during the Newport Rising

See also
Llanelly, a former Welsh gold-mining town near Tarnagulla, Australia

References

External links

Villages in Monmouthshire
Communities in Monmouthshire